Pheosia gnoma, the lesser swallow prominent, is a moth from the family Notodontidae. The species was first described by Johan Christian Fabricius in 1777.

The moth can be found across the Palearctic realm (northern and central Europe, Russia, eastern Siberia, Russian Far East, Amur). It has a forewing length of 20–26 mm.

Description
The imago can be easily confused with Pheosia tremula but P. gnoma is usually smaller, and the ground colour has usually less brown in it. The chief character by which it may be distinguished is the broader and clearer white wedge-shaped mark between veins 1 and 2 on the forewings of P. gnoma.

The host plant of the lesser swallow prominent is the birch (Betula) (British Isles), Betula pendula (Finland) Betula pubescens (Finland).

The moth survives winter as a pupa underground.

References

Further reading
South R. (1907) The Moths of the British Isles, (First Series), Frederick Warne & Co. Ltd., London & NY: 359 pp. online

External links

Fauna Europaea
 Taxonomy
Lepiforum e.V.
De Vlinderstichting 

Notodontidae
Moths of Europe
Taxa named by Johan Christian Fabricius